Lars Eliel Sonck (10 August 1870 – 14 March 1956) was a Finnish architect. He graduated from Helsinki Polytechnic Institute in 1894 and immediately won a major design competition for a church in Turku, St Michael's Church, ahead of many established architects. The church was designed in the prevailing neo-Gothic style. However, Sonck's style would soon go through a dramatic change, in the direction of Art Nouveau and National Romanticism that was moving through Europe at the end of the 19th century. During the 1920s, Sonck would also design a number of buildings in the emerging Nordic Classicism style.

Architecture and town planning

A prominent figure in Finland's search for architectural identity – at a period when Finland was a Grand Duchy under the control of Russia and Finnish politicians, intellectuals and artists were defining a distinct national identity – Sonck played a leading role in the development of National Romanticism, along with such other architects as Herman Gesellius, Armas Lindgren, and Eliel Saarinen. This style of architecture is often seen as part of the Art Nouveau style or Jugendstil, but shows influences from Romanesque architecture as well as elements borrowed from the historical tradition of Finland's medieval stone structures and residential wooden architecture. Among Sonck's well-known works in the neo-Romanesque style are Kallio Church, Helsinki (1912) and Kultaranta, the President of Finland's official summer residence in Naantali (1916); in the Jugendstil style are Tampere Cathedral, Tampere (1907) the Eira Hospital, Helsinki (1905) and "Ainola" (1903), the family home for the composer Jean Sibelius in Järvenpää; in the Nordic Classicism style are the housing blocks on Museokatu Street, in Töölö, Helsinki (c. 1920) and the Mikael Agricola Church, Helsinki (1935).

Sonck was also active in city planning theory debate, between the picturesque theories of Austrian theorist Camillo Sitte versus fellow Austrian Otto Wagner. Sonck favoured the former approach. The debate came to a head in Finland in the first ever town planning design competition in 1898–1900 for the Töölö district of Helsinki. Three entries were lifted out for recognition; first prize to Gustaf Nyström, second prize to Lars Sonck, and third prize to a joint entry by Sonck, Bertil Jung and Valter Thomé. A fantastic sketch accompanying Sonck's competition entry gives an indication of the imagery he was aiming for, inspired by his travels in Germany. Historian Pekka Korvenmaa makes the point that leading theme was the creation of the atmosphere of medieval urban environments – and Sonck later designed a similar proposal in 1904 to rearrange the immediate surroundings of St.Michael's Church in Helsinki, with numerous "fantastic" spired buildings. In the Töölö competition, undecided what course of action to take, however, the City Council asked the prize-winners to submit new proposals. When this led to further stalemate Nyström and Sonck were commissioned to work together on the final plan combining Nyström's spacious street network and elements of Sonck's Sittesque details. The final plan (1916) under the direction of Jung, made the scheme more uniform, while the architecture is seen as typical of the Nordic Classicism style. A typical street in the plan is that of Museokatu, with tall lines of buildings in the restrained Nordic Classicism style along a curving street line, designed by Sonck. A still wider new tree-lined boulevard was that of Helsinginkatu, driven through the working-class district of Kallio, first outlined in 1887 by Sonck.

Gallery of Lars Sonck's works

References

See also
 Architecture of Finland

1870 births
1956 deaths
People from Kokkola
People from Vaasa Province (Grand Duchy of Finland)
Swedish-speaking Finns
Finnish architects
Art Nouveau architects